Indiana Blaze was a W-League women's soccer team based in Indianapolis, Indiana. The Blaze left the league after the completion of the 2001 season.

W-League history (1997–2001)
Indiana Blaze joined the W-League in 1997 and entered the newly formed W-2 in 1998 when the league split. Blaze was the sister team of the Indiana Blast who moved up to the A-League in 1999 after two seasons in the D3 Pro League. Blaze and Blast were known for the overlapping game times on adjacent fields at Kuntz Stadium.

1998
Final W-League record of 5–7
USASA Region II runners-up
US Women's Amateur Cup National Finalist

1999
Midwest Division Champions
Playoffs: Indiana 0 @ North Texas 1 (OT) 
North Texas eventual champions (5–1 over Springfield)
W-2 Most Valuable Player – Joy Aschenbrener (28 G 13 A)

2000
Central Conference Champions  Wendy Dillinger's 45-yard upper 90 blast in the 65th minute and Joy Aschenbrener's toe-poke in the 90th minute gave Indiana a come-from-behind victory over the Cincinnati Ladyhawks and vaulted them into the W-League National Championship Playoffs. Indiana needed two victories in back-to-back games versus Cincinnati in the season's final week to bypass the Ladyhawks for first place in the conference and they delivered with 4–2 and 3–2 wins.
Semifinals (Friday August 4): Charlotte 2 vs Indiana 1 (OT)
Third Place Match (Sunday August 6): Oklahoma 1 vs Indiana 2 (OT) In the third-place match, a pair of substitutes scored goals to help the Indiana Blaze overcome a one-goal deficit and defeat the Oklahoma Outrage, 2–1 in sudden death. Kara Bryan, who came on in the 65th minute, slotted the ball into the far corner of the net after receiving a cross from the left side from Joy Aschenbrener eight minutes into overtime to give Indiana the victory. Halftime substitute Alisa Pykett had tied the game at 1–1 in the 72nd minute on a spectacular diving header at the far post on a cross from Lori Lindsey. The Outrage, despite playing with only one eligible substitute, took the lead midway through the first half when Cami Bybee finished a corner kick taken by Andi Lute in the 22nd minute.
W-2 Assist Leader – Kara Bryan (5)
W-2 All-League Team – Lori Lindsey

2001
Final Record 4–7–1
The Kentucky Fillies climbed closer to playoff contention with a 2–1 win over the Indiana Blaze in United Soccer League W-League action Friday night. Fillies forward Christal Mattingly scored the winning goal in the 81st minute.

Suspension of operations
Owner MorSports, Inc. suspended operations of their women's team, the Indiana Blaze, for the 2002 playing season. Owner and President of MorSports, Kim Morris said, "We're in this for the long haul. We want both of our teams to be around for many years to come and if that means suspending the women's team for a season to stabilize our operations, then that is what we should do."

They were the first high-profile women's sports team in the state, and the team's fan support increased each season, averaging nearly 2,000 fans per game in 2001.

Managers
Marc Behringer (1998–2001) made quite a splash in his first year as head coach of the Indiana Blaze.  The club was its first ever Midwest Division championship and W-League playoff berth.

After scoring 31 goals his senior year and 80 in his career at Cathedral High School in Indianapolis, Behringer played for Indiana University from 1984–1988, captaining the NCAA Championship team as a senior.  He played two seasons for the Indiana Blast as a defender, recording a goal and an assist in 17 games.

Behringer has served as the girls' head soccer coach at his alma mater since 1996.  He was named "City Coach of the Year" by the Indianapolis Star three times.

Behringer was assisted by Sherwin Simon.

Year-by-year regular season record

All-time roster

External links

Women's soccer clubs in Indiana
Blaze
Defunct USL W-League (1995–2015) teams
1997 establishments in Indiana
2001 disestablishments in Indiana
Association football clubs established in 1997
Association football clubs disestablished in 2001